Longwu (18 August 1645 – 4 February 1647) was the era name of the Longwu Emperor of the Southern Ming, and was used for 2 years. On 24 December 1646 (Longwu 2, 18th day of the 11th month), after the Yongli Emperor ascended to the throne, he continued to use this era name, and the era was changed to Yongli in the following year.

From 11 October (14th day of the 9th month) to 21 October (24th day of the 9th month) 1647, Zhang Huashan (張華山), a rebel leader in Huai'an, used this era name to start his uprising.

From 2 March (9th day of the 2nd month) 1648 to 1 March (19th day of the 1st month) 1649, Jin Shenghuan (金聲桓), commander (總兵, zong bing) of Jiangxi, used this era name to start his uprising.

Comparison table
The Gānzhī of each month on the right side of the table was the first day of each month. "(Long)" means that the month has 30 days, and "(Short)" means that the month has 29 days. The numbers in the "leap month" table indicate the X leap month of that year, and the numbers below the first day of each month indicate the corresponding Western calendar date.

Other regime era names that existed during the same period
 China
 Shunzhi (順治, 1644–1661): Qing dynasty — era name of the Shunzhi Emperor
 Qingguang (清光, 1645): Qing period — era name of Hu Shoulong (胡守龍)
 Jianguo Lu (監國魯, 1646–1653): Southern Ming — era name of Zhu Yihai, Prince of Lu
 Dingwu (定武, 1646–1664): Southern Ming — era name of Zhu Benli (Zhu Danji), Prince of Han (Doubtful)
 Dongwu (東武, 1648): Southern Ming — era name of Zhu Changqing, Prince of Huai
 Dashun (大順, 1644–1646): Xi dynasty — era name of Zhang Xianzhong
 Vietnam
 Phúc Thái (福泰, 1643–1649): Later Lê dynasty — era name of Lê Chân Tông
 Thuận Đức (順德, 1638–1677): Mạc dynasty — era name of Mạc Kính Vũ
 Japan
 Shōhō (正保, 1644–1648): era name of Emperor Go-Kōmyō

See also
 List of Chinese era names
 List of Ming dynasty era names

References

Further reading

Southern Ming eras